Vasily Alekseyevich Nebenzya (born 26 February 1962) is a Russian diplomat and the current Permanent Representative of Russia to the United Nations. His official title is Ambassador Extraordinary and Plenipotentiary.

Life and career
Nebenzya was born 26 February 1962 in Volgograd. His father was Deputy Chairman of the USSR State Committee for Publishing Aleksei Andreevich Nebenzya (1923–1994). He graduated from the Moscow State Institute of International Relations in 1983. Since then he has pursued a diplomatic career.

1988–1990 — attaché of the USSR Embassy in Thailand.
1990–1991 — third Secretary Directorate for international economic relations of the Ministry of Foreign Affairs of the USSR.
1991–1992 — second Secretary Department of international organizations Ministry of Foreign Affairs of the USSR and Russia.
1993-1996 — head of Department, Department of international organizations Ministry of Foreign Affairs of Russia.
1996–2000 — Advisor, senior Counsellor, Permanent Mission of Russia to the UN.
2000–2006 — head of Department, Deputy Director of the Department of international organizations Ministry of Foreign Affairs of Russia.
2006–2011 — Deputy Permanent Representative of Russia to the World Trade Organization.
2011–2012 — Deputy Permanent Representative of Russia to the United Nations office and other international organizations in Geneva.
2012–2013 — Director of Department for humanitarian cooperation and human rights Ministry of Foreign Affairs of Russia.
2013–2017 — Deputy Minister of Foreign Affairs of Russia.
Since 27 July 2017 — Russia's Permanent Representative to the United Nations.

Permanent Representative of Russia to the UN

Nomination and confirmation
In February 2017, Russia's Permanent Representative to the UN Vitaly Churkin died. In March 2017, Nebenzya was named as one of the main candidates for the post alongside the Permanent Representative of Russia to NATO Alexander Grushko, and the Deputy Minister of Foreign Affairs Anatoly Antonov.

On 21 April 2017, the Ministry of Foreign Affairs of Russia nominated him for the post of UN Ambassador. The following month he was officially approved by the Federal Assembly of Russia.

President Vladimir Putin appointed Nebenzya as Permanent Representative to the United Nations on 27 July 2017, and he presented his credentials to the UN Secretary-General António Guterres the following day.

Invasion of Ukraine in 2022 
At the time of the Russian invasion of Ukraine in late February 2022, Nebenzya was serving as the president of the UN Security Council, a position which rotates monthly between the 15 UN member states with seats on the Council. The holder of the presidency is considered to be the "face" and spokesperson of the UNSC. On 23 February 2022, President Vladimir Putin announced the invasion via video message while the Security Council was meeting. When the Ukrainian Representative Sergiy Kyslytsya called upon Nebenzya to "call Lavrov right now" and "do everything possible to stop the war", Nebenzya simply stated that "waking up Minister Lavrov at this time is not something I plan to do". Despite calls for his resignation, Nebenzya did not offer it, and in fact vetoed a proposed resolution by the UNSC condemning the invasion.

Speaking at the 11th emergency special session of UN on the 2022 Russian invasion of Ukraine, Nebenzya maintained that "… there is a need to demilitarize and de-nazify Ukraine" and that "media and social networks" had "distorted and thwarted" the image of Russia's actions.

At a UN Security Council meeting of 14 January 2023, Nebenzya stated that "only when the threat for Russia no longer emanates from the territory of Ukraine and when the discrimination against the Russian-speaking population of this country ends" it could stop its military actions. Nebenzya continued that "Otherwise, Moscow will get what it wants militarily". Nebenzya further claimed that Russia does not want "the destruction of Ukraine as a state, its de-Ukrainianisation and forced Russification''.

Notes

References

External links

C-SPAN appearances

1962 births
Living people
Moscow State Institute of International Relations alumni
Soviet diplomats
Russian diplomats
20th-century diplomats
21st-century diplomats
Ambassador Extraordinary and Plenipotentiary (Russian Federation)
Permanent Representatives of Russia to the United Nations
Politicians from Volgograd
Recipients of the Medal of the Order "For Merit to the Fatherland" II class
Recipients of the Order "For Merit to the Fatherland", 4th class
Recipients of the Order of Honour (Russia)